Toni Palermo was born in Forest Park, Illinois. She played as part of the All-American Girls Professional Baseball League (AAGPBL) in 1949 and 1950.

Early life
Toni's parents were Fred and Elvira Palermo. She was invited to travel to Cuba for spring training with the All American Girls Professional Baseball League when she was only 11. A few years later she became a member of their league as a shortstop.

Teams
Palermo was a shortstop who played with the Chicago Colleens in 1949 and 1950. She also played with the Springfield Sallies in 1950. She played professional softball as well with the Parichy Bloomer girls of the National Girls Baseball League.

Stats

Awards
She was recognized by the Baseball Association of Chicago for "Excellence as an AAGPBL Player, Educator and Leader."

Life after baseball
Toni became a nun. She earned her Bachelor of Science degree in English, History and Math from Alverno College. She then earned three master's degrees and a Doctor of Philosophy Degree from the University of Wisconsin–Madison. She taught in the Physical Education Department and the School of Social Work at the University. She was on the show To Tell the Truth and was the number 2 contestant and only two people picked her as the hall of famer.

References

People from Forest Park, Illinois
All-American Girls Professional Baseball League
All-American Girls Professional Baseball League players
Baseball players from Illinois
Living people
Alverno College alumni
University of Wisconsin–Madison alumni
University of Wisconsin–Madison faculty
Year of birth missing (living people)
National Girls Baseball League players
American women academics
21st-century American women
American female baseball players